LGBT is an initialism for lesbian, gay, bisexual, and transgender.

LGBT may also refer to:
"LGBT", a song by RuPaul featuring Chi Chi LaRue and Markaholic from Realness (2015)
"Lgbt", a song by CupcakKe from Audacious (2016)

See also
 LGBT community
 LGBT culture
 LGBT history
 Outline of LGBT topics